Iris potaninii  is a species in the genus Iris, it is also in the subgenus of Iris and in the Psammiris section. It is a rhizomatous perennial, from Siberia in Russia, Mongolia and China. It is a dwarf plant, having either subterranean or very small stems, long thin leaves and 
yellow, or dark violet to purplish blue flowers. It is cultivated as an ornamental plant in temperate regions.

Description
Similar in form to Iris tigridia (within Pseudoregalia section) and Iris bloudowii (another Psammiris section iris), but differs from bloudowii, in having an ob-conical, not prostrate rhizome. It differs from tigridia by having old leaf fibres on the rhizome. It also differs from Iris tigridia in leaf form, Iris potaninii has rounded ended leaves, which do not end in a point.

It has thick, short and tough rhizomes. Under the rhizomes, are thick, fleshy and yellowish, secondary roots. also  On top of the rhizome, are the curled, fibrous remains of last seasons leaves.

It has linear basal (growing from the base) leaves, which are not pointed at the ends (or obtuse).

It is a dwarf plant, having either subterranean, or very small stems or pedicels.

The pedicel (or dwarf stem) has 2 narrow, lanceolate (or oblong-lanceolate,) and (scarious) membranous spathes or bracts (leaves of the flower bud).

The stem (or pedicel) holds 1 terminal (top of stem) flower, between April to May (in Russia), or May to June.

It has 2 pairs of petals, 3 large sepals (outer petals), known as the 'falls' and 3 inner, smaller petals (or tepals), known as the 'standards'. The falls are obovate (in shape), with markings or veins around a central yellowish or whitish beard.
They also have curled up edges.

It also has 1.5 cm long stamens, purple anthers and a 0.7 cm long (spindle-shaped) ovary. It has a 2.8 cm long and 6mm wide style branch, which has a flat crest and toothed edges.

After the iris has flowered, between June or July (in Russia), or between July and September, it produces an ellipsoid seed capsule.
It dehisces (splits open) from the middle of the capsule. Inside the capsule are seeds which are 3 mm (in diameter), flattened globular, or pyriform (pear shaped), wrinkled, and reddish brown in colour.

Biochemistry
In 2002, a study was carried out on the rhizome of Iris potaninii. It found several chemical compounds, including 2 new isoflavones, 6, 3', 4'-trimethoxy-7 and 8, 5'-trihydroxyisoflavone.

In 2008, a study was carried out on the anatomical structure of the leaf and drought resistance of 4 different species of Iris (Iris songarica, Iris potaninii, Iris loczyi and Iris lactea) from Qinghai, China. It showed that all the species were strongly adaptable to drought conditions.

Genetics
In 2012, a genetic study was carried out on Iris laevigata and its from several closely related iris species, including Iris ensata, Iris setosa, Iris halophila, Iris scariosa, Iris potaninii, Iris tenuifolia, Iris bloudowii, and Iris sanguinea.

As most irises are diploid, having two sets of chromosomes, this can be used to identify hybrids and classification of groupings. It was counted in 1984 by Doronkin, as 2n=22. It is normally published as 2n=22.

Taxonomy
It has the common name of 'curl-sheath iris' (in China), or 'Potanin iris'.

It is written as 卷鞘鸢尾 in Chinese script, and known as juan qiào yuān wěi in Pinyin in China.

The Latin specific epithet potaninii refers to Grigory Potanin (a Russian ethnographer and natural historian).

It was found in western Kansu (Gansu) in 1876.

It was first published and described by Maxim. in 'Bull. Acad. Imp. Sci. Saint-Pétersbourg' Vol.26 page528 in 1880.

It was also published in 'Mélanges Biol. Bull. Phys.-Math. Acad. Imp. Sci. Saint-Pétersbourg' Vol.10 page724 in 1880.

In 1980's, it was thought to be part of the 'Pseudoregelias section', but it is still within the Psammiris section, in most sources.

It was verified by United States Department of Agriculture and the Agricultural Research Service on 4 April 2003 and then updated on 10 April 2012.

Iris potaninii is an accepted name by the RHS.

Distribution and habitat
Iris potaninii is native to temperate areas of Asia.

Range
It is found in the Russian Federation, within Siberia, in the states of Aga Buryat, Buryatia, Chita (including Dahuria (or Transbaikal),) and Gorno-Altai. 
It is also found in China, in the provinces of Gansu, Qinghai, Sichuan and Xizang.
It is also though to be found in Mongolia, and Tibet.

Habitat
It grows on the rocky, gravelly or stony slopes, on dry hillsides, of mountains.

Conservation
The iris is listed as 'rare', in Red Data Book of the Altai region. One colony of the iris is protected within Daursky Nature Reserve (in Chita Oblast, Russia).

Cultivation
hardy, soil, sun, moisture, situation, pests, planting

It is hardy in Russia, surviving winter in St Petersburg without shelter.
It is hardy in a sheltered place, in the UK.

It prefers to grow in sunny positions, in well-drained soils.

It has been tried in various botanical gardens within Russia, since 1992, in Barnaul, Chita and St. Petersburg.

It could be grown within gardens, in a rock garden, or mixed borders.

Uses
Iris potaninii has been used in traditional Mongolian herbal medicine, in the treatment of various diseases, including bacterial infections, cancers and inflammations.
Also, some benzoquinones have been isolated from Iris species rhizomes, and used as anti-cancer agents in modern Chinese medicines.

References

Sources
 Czerepanov, S. K. 1995. Vascular plants of Russia and adjacent states (the former USSR).
 Komarov, V. L. et al., eds. 1934–1964. Flora SSSR. [lists as I. potanini Maxim.].
 Mathew, B. 1981. The Iris. 40.
 Waddick, J. W. & Zhao Yu-tang. 1992. Iris of China.
 Wu Zheng-yi & P. H. Raven et al., eds. 1994–. Flora of China (English edition).

External links

 has an image of the iris in flower
 has a close-up image of the iris in flower

potaninii
Flora of Mongolia
Flora of Siberia
Flora of Xinjiang
Garden plants of Asia
Plants described in 1880
Medicinal plants of Asia